Laurel Creek Conservation Area, or simply Laurel Creek, is a park located in Waterloo, Ontario, Canada. The park is owned by the Grand River Conservation Authority (GRCA). Laurel Creek is open year-round and offers several outdoor activities, such as swimming, campsites, picnic tables, and playgrounds.

References 

Conservation areas in Ontario
Waterloo, Ontario